Venezuela competed at the 2004 Summer Paralympics in Athens, Greece. The team included sixteen athletes—fourteen men and two women. Venezuelan competitors won four medals, three silver and one bronze, to finish sixty-first in the medal table.

Medallists

Sports

Archery

|-
|align=left|Luiz Martinez
|align=left|Men's individual standing
|538
|19
|W 138-133
|L 134-147
|colspan=4|did not advance
|}

Athletics

Men's track

Men's field

Women's track

Cycling

Men's road

Men's track

Judo

Powerlifting

Men

Swimming

Men

Women

Table tennis

Men

See also
Venezuela at the Paralympics
Venezuela at the 2004 Summer Olympics

References 

Nations at the 2004 Summer Paralympics
2004
Summer Paralympics